Marvin E. Miller Sr. (May 28, 1927 – October 4, 1999) is a former Republican member of the Pennsylvania House of Representatives. His son, Marvin E. Miller Jr., was also a state representative.

References

Republican Party members of the Pennsylvania House of Representatives
1927 births
1999 deaths
20th-century American politicians